Cerithium traillii is a species of sea snail, a marine gastropod mollusk in the family Cerithiidae.

Description

Distribution
The distribution of Cerithium traillii includes Indo-Pacific and throughout Southeast Asia.
 Philippines
 Indonesia
 Singapore

References

Cerithiidae
Gastropods described in 1855